William Cooper (1886 – Unknown) was an English footballer who played as a wing half for Barnsley and Dundee, as well as non-league football for various other clubs. He was born in Mexborough.

References 

English footballers
Mexborough F.C. players
Denaby United F.C. players
Barnsley F.C. players
Portsmouth F.C. players
Dundee F.C. players
Castleford Town F.C. players
Rochdale A.F.C. players
Lincoln City F.C. players
Altrincham F.C. players

1886 births
Year of death missing